Ecoair International was an airline based in Algiers, Algeria, founded in 1999. In 2002 it was integrated into Khalifa Group, the parent company of Khalifa Airways. Operating out of Houari Boumedienne Airport, Ecoair International provided flights to Europe, including Brussels-Charleroi and North Africa, and within Algeria.

Code data

IATA Code: 9H
ICAO Code: DEI

History
Ecoair International was established in 1999 and started operations with the help of Khalifa Airways and the Khalifa Group.

Fleet
Until its bankruptcy, the airline had 6 Boeing 737 Classic, all are leased from various airlines, including:

4 Boeing 737-200.

1 Boeing 737-300.

1 Boeing 737-400.

See also
 List of defunct airlines of Algeria

References

External links
Airline recorded as defunct in: Airline History, Algeria

Defunct airlines of Algeria
Airlines established in 1999
Airlines disestablished in 2002
1999 establishments in Algeria
2002 disestablishments in Algeria
Companies based in Algiers